South Wexford was a UK Parliament constituency in Ireland, returning one Member of Parliament from 1885 to 1922.

Prior to 1885 the area was part of the County Wexford constituency. From 1922, on the establishment of the Irish Free State, the area was not represented in the UK Parliament.

Boundaries
This constituency was created under the Redistribution of Seats Act 1885 and comprised the southern part of County Wexford. Under the Redistribution of Seats (Ireland) Act 1918, the boundary was expanded to include the part of New Ross urban district transferred from County Kilkenny under the Local Government (Ireland) Act 1898.

1885–1918: The baronies of Bargy, Forth and Shelburne, and those parts of the baronies of Bantry and Shelmaliere West not included in the constituency of North Wexford.

1918–1922: The existing South Wexford constituency together with that part of the existing South Kilkenny constituency contained within the administrative county of Wexford.

Members of Parliament

Elections

Elections in the 1880s

Elections in the 1890s

Barry resigns, prompting a by-election.

Elections in the 1900s

Elections in the 1910s

References

The Parliaments of England by Henry Stooks Smith (1st edition published in three volumes 1844–50), 2nd edition edited (in one volume) by F.W.S. Craig (Political Reference Publications 1973)

Westminster constituencies in County Wexford (historic)
Dáil constituencies in the Republic of Ireland (historic)
Constituencies of the Parliament of the United Kingdom established in 1885
Constituencies of the Parliament of the United Kingdom disestablished in 1922